Noy, NOy or NOY may refer to:

Noy language

People
Abhinoy Noy
Joaquín Noy
Wilfred Noy
Noy Castillo
Noy Holland
Nôy
Van Noy (surname)
Vannoy (surname)

Other
Noy (film)
Noy (album)
Noy (brandy)
Noy (Israeli political faction)
NOy, a component of air pollution